Happy Birthday to You! is a 1959 children's book by Dr. Seuss, the first all-color picture book.

Plot 
It deals with a fantastic land called Katroo, where the Birthday Bird throws the reader an amazing party on their special day. It consists of a running description of a fantastical celebration, narrated in the second person, of the reader's birthday, from dawn to late night.

The celebration includes fantastical and colorful gifts, foods and a whirl of activities all arranged by the Birthday Bird for the reader's birthday. It focuses on the reader's self-actualization and concludes with the happy and exhausted reader falling blissfully asleep.  

A popular Seuss paragraph in this book reads: "Today you are you, that is truer than true. There is no one alive who is youer than you".

Adaptations  
Although Happy Birthday to You! was not directly adapted, The Birthday Bird appears in an episode of The Wubbulous World of Dr. Seuss.

The book is dedicated to the author's "good friends" and "The Children of San Diego County".

References

1959 children's books
American children's books
American picture books
Children's fiction books
English-language books
Works about children
Books about birds
Birthdays in fiction
Books by Dr. Seuss
Random House books